WHRZ-LP (104.1 FM, "The Z") is a non-commercial low-power radio station in Spartanburg, South Carolina. Owned by the First Baptist Church of Spartanburg, it broadcasts a youth-oriented Christian CHR format. The station is licensed by the FCC to broadcast with an ERP of 47 watts (.047 kW). Its transmitter is located on the former WSPA-TV tower in downtown Spartanburg. The station has a range of approximately 10 miles, although it reaches a wider audience via FM translators, and syndication of its programming on HD Radio subchannels of WLFJ-FM and WLFS.

History 
The station originally signed on in May 2005, broadcasting a Christian CHR format targeting teenagers and young adults. It initially used the branding Hangar Radio Z, referencing the nickname for the Church's recently-constructed youth center ("The Hangar"), which also housed the station's studios.

Translators
In addition to the main station at 104.1, the station operates multiple FM translators to broaden its coverage over the upstate of South Carolina, as well as the Charleston area:

As part of an agreement with Radio Training Network, the station's programming is also syndicated on the HD Radio subchannels of WLFJ-FM/Greenville and WLFS/Port Wentworth—co-branded as His Radio Z.

References

External links
 
 

HRZ-LP
HRZ-LP
Radio stations established in 2005